Gary R. Francoeur (born June 14, 1957) is an American politician.

Early life 
On June 14, 1957, Francoeur was born in Nashua, New Hampshire.

Education 
In 1979, Francoeur earned a bachelor of science degree from the University of New Hampshire.

Career 
Francoeur served in the New Hampshire House of Representatives from 1994 to 1996 and in the New Hampshire Senate from the 14th district from 1996 to 2002.

Personal life 
Francoeur's wife is Beatrice. They have five children.

References

1957 births
Living people
Republican Party members of the New Hampshire House of Representatives
Republican Party New Hampshire state senators